The West DeLand Residential District is a U.S. historic district in DeLand, Florida. On November 20, 1992, it was added to the U.S. National Register of Historic Places.

References

External links

 Volusia County listings at National Register of Historic Places

Gallery

National Register of Historic Places in Volusia County, Florida
Historic districts on the National Register of Historic Places in Florida
DeLand, Florida